Pietro De Giorgio (born 16 February 1983) is an Italian professional footballer who plays for Este.

Biography
Born in Praia a Mare, Calabria region, De Giorgio spent a season with Serie D club Battipagliese before he was signed by a professional club San Marino in 2001 in temporary deal from Napoli. In January 2002 he left the Serie C2 club for Serie B club Napoli, the parent company of San Marino Calcio at that time. In 2002–03 season he was signed by Serie C1 club Cittadella in temporary deal. In January 2003 he was signed by Serie B club Messina along with Andrea Gaveglia in co-ownership deals, for a total fee of €26,000. In June 2003 the deals were renewed. De Giorgio also returned to Serie C2 for Melfi after only 1 appearances in the whole 2002–03 Serie C1. In June 2004 the co-ownership deals were extended again. However Napoli bankrupted at the start of season. Thus, De Giorgio who initially joined Serie C1 club Frosinone in temporary deal, was converted into new co-ownership deal.

Frosinone
De Giorgio joined Serie C1 club Frosinone on 9 July 2004 (converted to co-ownership deal in August), where he spent  seasons. The co-ownership deal with Messina was renewed in June 2005. De Giorgio only played 6 times in the first half of 2005–06 Serie C1. In the second half he was transferred to fellow third division club Giulianova. Frosinone finished as the promotion playoffs winner of Group B while Giulianova finished as the 12th of Group A. In June 2006 Messina gave up the remain 50% registration rights of De Giorgio to the Serie B newcomer.

Cavese
On 6 July 2006 De Giorgio and Giuseppe Aquino left for Serie C1 club Cavese in co-ownership deals. De Giorgio spent 2 seasons with the Cava de' Tirreni based club. In June 2008 the club renewed the co-ownership again. However at the start of season he was sold to Perugia, with Frosinone retained 50% registration rights.

Perugia
De Giorgio joined Lega Pro Prima Divisione (ex–Serie C1) club Perugia Calcio in mid-2008. In June 2009 Frosinone gave up the remain 50% registration rights to Perugia, after no agreement was made before the deadline. However Perugia decided to sell De Giorgio after acquiring the full contractual rights.

Empoli
De Giorgio was signed by Serie B club Empoli in August 2009. He made 7 starts and 12 substitutes in 2009–10 Serie B.

Crotone
In July 2010 De Giorgio was signed by fellow second division club Crotone on a reported Bosman transfer. He made his 100th Serie B appearance on 28 March 2013.

References

External links
 Lega Serie B profile 
 AIC profile (data by football.it) 
 

Italian footballers
S.S.C. Napoli players
A.S.D. Victor San Marino players
A.S. Cittadella players
A.C.R. Messina players
A.S. Melfi players
Frosinone Calcio players
Giulianova Calcio players
A.C. Perugia Calcio players
Empoli F.C. players
F.C. Crotone players
Latina Calcio 1932 players
L.R. Vicenza players
Serie B players
Serie C players
Association football midfielders
Sportspeople from the Province of Cosenza
Footballers from Calabria
1983 births
Living people